Grevillea parviflora, commonly known as small-flower grevillea, is a species of flowering plant in the family Proteaceae and is endemic to the Sydney region of eastern New South Wales. It is a low, dense, spreading to erect shrub with more or less linear leaves and white flowers with a red style that sometimes turns red as it ages.

Description
The flowers are arranged in groups of 4 to 14 on the ends of branches, the groups usually shorter than the nearby leaves.

Taxonomy
Grevillea parviflora was first formally described in 1810 by Robert Brown in Transactions of the Linnean Society of London. The specific epithet (parviflora) means "small-flowered".

In 2000, Robert Owen Makinson described two subspecies of G. parviflora in the Flora of Australia, and the names are accepted by the Australian Plant Census:

Distribution and habitat
This grevillea grows heath or shrubby or heathy woodland in the Sydney region. Subspecies parviflora is mostly found west and south of Sydney between Camden, Appin and Cordeaux Dam with disjunct populations near Putty, Cessnock and Cooranbong. Subspecies supplicans occurs north-west of Sydney near Arcadia, Maroota and Marramarra National Park.

Conservation status
Subspecies parviflora is listed as "vulnerable" under the Australian Government Environment Protection and Biodiversity Conservation Act 1999 and the New South Wales Government Biodiversity Conservation Act 2016 and subsp. supplicans as "endangered" under the Biodiversity Conservation Act 2016.

References

parviflora
Flora of New South Wales
Proteales of Australia
Taxa named by Robert Brown (botanist, born 1773)
Plants described in 1810